"Baby-Baby-Baby" is a song by American girl group TLC. It was the second single released from their debut studio album, Ooooooohhh... On the TLC Tip (1992), and their second consecutive top-10 hit. It was the most successful single from the album, reaching number two on the US Billboard Hot 100 and number one on the Billboard Hot R&B/Hip-Hop Songs chart, giving them their first number-one single on that chart.

Background
"Baby-Baby-Baby" was written and produced by Babyface, L.A. Reid and Daryl Simmons. The song features lead vocals from Tionne "T-Boz" Watkins, with Rozonda "Chilli" Thomas adlibbing and singing the middle-8 sections. It is the first song not to contain a rap by Lisa "Left Eye" Lopes, who instead recorded a rap for the song's remix version.

Commercial performance
"Baby-Baby-Baby" held the runner-up spot on the Billboard Hot 100 for six consecutive weeks, from August 15 to September 19, 1992. It also reached number one on the Billboard Hot R&B/Hip-Hop Songs chart. "Baby-Baby-Baby" finished at number five on the Billboard Year-End Hot 100 Singles of 1992, and was certified Platinum by the Recording Industry Association of America (RIAA) in 1992.

Music video
"Baby-Baby-Baby" had a video depicting TLC at Bowie State University campus and in their dorms, where they have a slumber party. One of the posters reads 'Protection is Priority'.

Charts

Weekly charts

Year-end charts

Decade-end charts

Certifications

Release history

See also
 List of number-one R&B singles of 1992 (U.S.)

References

TLC (group) songs
1992 singles
1992 songs
Arista Records singles
LaFace Records singles
Song recordings produced by Babyface (musician)
Song recordings produced by Daryl Simmons
Song recordings produced by L.A. Reid
Songs written by Babyface (musician)
Songs written by Daryl Simmons
Songs written by L.A. Reid